Boronia hoipolloi is a plant in the citrus family Rutaceae and is endemic to a small area in Queensland. It is an erect or pendulous shrub with pinnate leaves and pink, four-petalled flowers. It is only known from a few collections near Mount Isa.

Description
The eight stamens are hairy with those opposite the sepals longer than those near the petals.

Taxonomy and naming
Boronia hoipolloi was first formally described in 1999 by Marco F. Duretto who published the description in   Austrobaileya. The specific epithet (hoipolloi) is derived from the Ancient Greek hoi polloi meaning "rabble", referring to the habitat of the type specimens "being found on the outer parts of an amphitheatre, where one expects to find 'the rabble' congregating".

Distribution and habitat

Conservation
Boronia hoipolloi is listed as "least concern" under the Queensland Government Nature Conservation Act 1992.

References 

hoipolloi
Flora of Queensland
Plants described in 1999
Taxa named by Marco Duretto